Aparajita Adhya (c.1978 - ) is an Indian actress who works primarily in the Bengali film and television industry.

She has been an actress for many years. In 1997 she met her husband, Atanu Hazra, who was assisting at a shoot. They married despite her family's disapproval.

She has been nominated for an acting award and she stars in the TV show Lokkhi Kakima Superstar.

Filmography

Television

References

External links 
 
 https://celebhub.in/bengali-news/in-bengali-serial-lokhi-kakima-superstars-lead-actress-aprajita-auddy-get-pregnant-in-serial/

Actresses in Bengali cinema
Living people
Bengali television actresses
Place of birth missing (living people)
Actresses from Kolkata
Year of birth missing (living people)